This was the first edition of the men's singles tournament.

Go Soeda won the title, defeating Blaž Kavčič 6–7(4–7), 6–4, 6–2 in the final.

Seeds

Draw

Finals

Top half

Bottom half

References
Main Draw
Qualifying Draw

Winnipeg National Bank Challenger
Winnipeg Challenger